Cen Hun (died 280) was an official of the state of Eastern Wu during the late Three Kingdoms period (220–280) of China.

Life
Cen Hun held positions among the Nine Ministers during the reign of Sun Hao, the fourth and last emperor of Wu. Historians described him as a corrupt official who oppressed the people. However, on one occasion, he led other officials to beg Sun Hao to spare the life of Zhang Shang (張尚), an official holding the position of Prefect of the Palace Writers (中書令), after Zhang Shang offended the emperor.

In 280, the Jin dynasty conquered Wu. After Sun Hao surrendered to the Jin dynasty, several former Wu officials blamed Cen Hun for causing the downfall of Wu and urged Sun Hao to execute him. Sun Hao reluctantly agreed, and even though he regretted his decision later and tried to rescind his order, it was too late as Cen Hun had already been executed.

In Romance of the Three Kingdoms
In the 14th-century historical novel Romance of the Three Kingdoms, which romanticises the events before and during the Three Kingdoms period, Cen Hun is portrayed as a palace eunuch and close aide of Sun Hao. He instigates the emperor's tyranny and plays a significant role in bringing about the corruption and decadence that led to the downfall of Wu in 280. After Sun Hao surrenders to the Jin dynasty, many former Wu officials blame him for causing Wu's downfall and had him executed by slow slicing.

See also
 Lists of people of the Three Kingdoms

Notes

References

 Chen, Shou (3rd century). Records of the Three Kingdoms (Sanguozhi).
 Luo, Guanzhong (14th century). Romance of the Three Kingdoms (Sanguo Yanyi).
 Pei, Songzhi (5th century). Annotations to Records of the Three Kingdoms (Sanguozhi zhu).

Year of birth unknown
280 deaths
Eastern Wu politicians
Executed Eastern Wu people
People executed by Eastern Wu
3rd-century executions